Andrew Osagie (born 19 February 1988 in Harlow, Essex) is an English athlete who specialises in the 800 metres. He represents Harlow Athletic Club at club level and Great Britain at international level. He is the fourth fastest Briton of all time.

While attending St Mary's University College he made rapid progress to win his first national titles and international medals. Osagie has performed well indoors, winning bronze medals at the IAAF World Indoor Championships in 2012 and 2014, as well as ranking second on the British Indoor All-Time list.

In the men's 800 metres final at the 2012 Summer Olympics in London, he finished eighth in a time of 1:43.77. This time would have won gold in all but two other Olympic Games, but the winner David Rudisha set a world record and the remaining medallists set the fastest time for place in the event. The summer outdoor season of 2013 saw a 5th-place finish in the 2013 World Championships in Athletics.

Competition record

Personal bests
Outdoor
 200m - 23.3 (St Ives  2009)
 400m - 47.69 (Watford 2017)
 600m - 1:20.7 (Loughborough  2008)
 800m - 1:43.77 (London 2012 2012)
 1000m - 2:17.18 (Stockholm 2018)
 1500m - 3:48.99 (Watford 2009)
 1 Mile - 4:10 (Gateshead  2011)
 Parkrun - 16:44 (Bushy Park 2016)
 TJ - 13.01 (Colchester  2004)

Indoor
 600m - 1:16.45 (Glasgow  2013)
 800m - 1:45.22 (Birmingham  2014)
 1000m - 2:18.56 (Birmingham  2011)

References

External links
 
 
 
 

1988 births
Living people
Sportspeople from Harlow
English male middle-distance runners
British male middle-distance runners
Olympic male middle-distance runners
Olympic athletes of Great Britain
Athletes (track and field) at the 2012 Summer Olympics
Commonwealth Games competitors for England
Athletes (track and field) at the 2010 Commonwealth Games
Athletes (track and field) at the 2014 Commonwealth Games
Athletes (track and field) at the 2018 Commonwealth Games
World Athletics Championships athletes for Great Britain
British Athletics Championships winners